The 2017 Brisbane International was a tournament of the 2017 ATP World Tour and 2017 WTA Tour. It was played on outdoor hard courts in Brisbane, Queensland, Australia. It was the ninth edition of the tournament and took place at the Queensland Tennis Centre in Tennyson. It was held from 1 to 8 January 2017 as part of the Australian Open Series in preparation for the first Grand Slam of the year.

It was announced on 24 August 2016 that 14-times Grand Slam champion Rafael Nadal would play at the event for the first time.

Points and prize money

Point distribution

Prize money 

1Qualifiers prize money is also the Round of 32 prize money.
*per team

ATP singles main-draw entrants

Seeds 

1 Rankings as of December 26, 2016.

Other entrants 
The following players received wildcards into the singles main draw:
  Sam Groth
  Jordan Thompson
  Elias Ymer

The following players received entry from the qualifying draw:
  Alex de Minaur
  Ernesto Escobedo
  Yoshihito Nishioka 
  Jared Donaldson

Withdrawals
Before the tournament
  Kevin Anderson → replaced by  Pierre-Hugues Herbert

ATP doubles main-draw entrants

Seeds 

1 Rankings as of December 26, 2016.

Other entrants 
The following pairs received wildcards into the doubles main draw:
  Sam Groth /  Chris Guccione
  Thanasi Kokkinakis /  Jordan Thompson

WTA singles main-draw entrants

Seeds 

1 Rankings as of December 26, 2016.

Other entrants 
The following players received wildcards into the singles main draw:
  Ashleigh Barty
  Donna Vekić

The following players received entry from the qualifying draw:
  Destanee Aiava
  Aleksandra Krunić
  Bethanie Mattek-Sands
  Asia Muhammad

The following player received entry as a lucky loser:
  Kateryna Bondarenko

Withdrawals
Before the tournament
  Carla Suárez Navarro (Shoulder injury) → replaced by  Kateryna Bondarenko

WTA doubles main-draw entrants

Seeds 

1 Rankings as of December 26, 2016.

Other entrants 
The following pair received a wildcard into the doubles main draw:
  Ashleigh Barty /  Casey Dellacqua

Champions

Men's singles 

  Grigor Dimitrov def.  Kei Nishikori, 6–2, 2–6, 6–3
 It was Grigor Dimitrov's fifth career title.

Women's singles 

  Karolína Plíšková def.  Alizé Cornet, 6–0, 6–3
 It was Karolína Plíšková's seventh career title.

Men's doubles 

  Thanasi Kokkinakis /  Jordan Thompson def.  Gilles Müller /  Sam Querrey, 7–6(9–7), 6–4

Women's doubles 

  Bethanie Mattek-Sands /  Sania Mirza def.  Ekaterina Makarova /  Elena Vesnina, 6–2, 6–3

Broadcast
Selected matches were aired in Australia on 7Two, with live coverage of both day and night sessions.

See also
 2017 Australian Open Series

References

External links 
 

 
2017 ATP World Tour
2017 WTA Tour
2017 in Australian tennis
2017
January 2017 sports events in Australia